Presidential elections are expected to be held in Mauritania in June 2024 or earlier.

Electoral system
Under Article 26 of the constitution the president is elected for a five-year term using the two round system. If no candidate received an absolute majority of thevote in the first round, a second round is held two weeks later between the two candidates who received the most votes.

Candidacy is restricted to citizens by birth aged between 40 and 75 (on the day of the first round) who have not had their civil and political rights removed. Article 23 also stipulates that the president has to be a Muslim. Article 28 establishes a term limit of two mandates, allowing the president to only be re-elected once.

The election of a new president is required to take place between 30 and 45 days before the expiration of the term of the incumbent president.

Candidates

Declared
 Biram Dah Abeid, deputy of the National Assembly since 2018 and candidate in 2014 and 2019.
 Elid Ould Mohameden, deputy of the National Assembly since 2018.

Potential
 Mohamed Ould Ghazouani, President of Mauritania since 2019.
 Mohamed Ould Abdel Aziz, President of Mauritania from 2008 until 2019.

References

Presidential elections in Mauritania
Mauritania